Acacia lanuginophylla, or woolly wattle, is a shrub of the genus Acacia and the subgenus Plurinerves that is endemic to south western Australia. It is currently listed as a vulnerable species according to the Environment Protection Biodiversity Conservation Act 1999.

Description
The wooly branchlets have yellow-green new shoots. It blooms from July to October and produces yellow flowers.

Taxonomy
The species was first formally described by the botanists Bruce Maslin and Richard Sumner Cowan in 1990 as part of the work Acacia Miscellany. Some oligoneurous species of Acacia (Leguminosae: Mimosoideae: Section Plurinerves) from Western Australia as published in the journal Nuytsia. It was reclassified as Racosperma lanuginophyllum by Leslie Pedley in 2003 then returned to genus Acacia'' in 2005.

Distribution
It is native to an area in the Wheatbelt and Goldfields-Esperance regions of Western Australia where it is commonly situated along drainage lines or in flat areas growing in clay-sand, sandy or gravelly soils as a part of open mallee over low scrub communities. There are only nine remaining populations or fifteen subpopulations of the plant remaining with an estimated 5,483 individuals remaining which are found in the Shire of Lake Grace and Shire of Yilgarn where over 75% of the native vegetation has been cleared.

See also
List of Acacia species

References

lanuginophylla
Acacias of Western Australia
Taxa named by Bruce Maslin
Plants described in 1990
Taxa named by Richard Sumner Cowan